William Bertram (31 December 1897 – 27 October 1962) was an English professional football inside forward who played in the Football League for Rochdale, Durham City, Norwich City and Newcastle United.

Personal life 
Bertram served as a private in the Durham Light Infantry during the First World War.

Career statistics

References 

English footballers
English Football League players
Place of death missing
Durham Light Infantry soldiers
Newcastle United F.C. players
Association football inside forwards
1897 births
1962 deaths
British Army personnel of World War I
Durham City A.F.C. players
Norwich City F.C. players
Rochdale A.F.C. players
Accrington Stanley F.C. (1891) players
Leadgate Park F.C. players
People from Brandon, County Durham
Footballers from County Durham